The fourth season of the American television series Supergirl, which is based on the DC Comics character Kara Zor-El / Supergirl, premiered on The CW on October 14, 2018. The season follows Kara, a reporter and superpowered alien who fights against those who threaten Earth. It is set in the Arrowverse, sharing continuity with the other television series of the universe. The season is produced by Berlanti Productions, Warner Bros. Television, and DC Entertainment, with Robert Rovner and Jessica Queller serving as showrunners.

The season was ordered in April 2018. Production began that July and concluded in April 2019. Melissa Benoist stars as Kara, with principal cast members Mehcad Brooks, Chyler Leigh, David Harewood, and Katie McGrath also returning from previous seasons, while Jesse Rath was promoted to the principal cast from his recurring status in season three. They are joined by new cast members Sam Witwer, Nicole Maines, and April Parker Jones. Former series regular Calista Flockhart makes an uncredited guest appearance in the third episode. The series was renewed for a fifth season on January 31, 2019.

Episodes

Cast and characters

Main 
 Melissa Benoist as Kara Danvers / Kara Zor-El / Supergirl and Red Daughter
 Mehcad Brooks as James Olsen / Guardian
 Chyler Leigh as Alex Danvers
 Katie McGrath as Lena Luthor
 Jesse Rath as Querl "Brainy" Dox / Brainiac 5
 Sam Witwer as Ben Lockwood / Agent Liberty
 Nicole Maines as Nia Nal / Dreamer
 April Parker Jones as Lauren Haley
 David Harewood as J'onn J'onzz / Martian Manhunter

Recurring

 Rhona Mitra as Mercy Graves 
 Robert Baker as Otis Graves 
 Anthony Konechny as Raymond Jensen / Parasite 
 Bruce Boxleitner as Phillip Baker 
 Andrea Brooks as Eve Teschmacher 
 Sarah Smyth as Lydia Lockwood 
 Graham Verchere as George Lockwood 
 David Ajala as Manchester Black 
 Donna Benedicto as DEO agent 
 Jessica Meraz as Pamela Ferrer / Menagerie 
 Azie Tesfai as Kelly Olsen 
  Jon Cryer as Lex Luthor

Guest

"Elseworlds" 
 John Wesley Shipp as Barry Allen / Flash of Earth-90 
 LaMonica Garrett as Mar Novu / The Monitor 
 Stephen Amell as Oliver Queen / Green Arrow 
 David Ramsey as John Diggle 
 Carlos Valdes as Cisco Ramon / Vibe 
 Danielle Panabaker as Caitlin Snow / Killer Frost 
 Tyler Hoechlin as Kal-El / Clark Kent / Superman and John Deegan / Superman 
 Grant Gustin as Barry Allen / Flash 
 Jeremy Davies as John Deegan 
 Ruby Rose as Kate Kane / Batwoman 
 Cassandra Jean Amell as Nora Fries 
 Adam Tsekhman as Gary Green 
 Bob Frazer as Roger Hayden / Psycho-Pirate 
 Elizabeth Tulloch as Lois Lane

Production

Development
At the Television Critics Association press tour in January 2018, The CW president Mark Pedowitz said he was "optimistic" and "confident" about Supergirl and the other Arrowverse shows returning next season, but added that it was too soon to announce anything just yet. On April 2, The CW renewed the series for its fourth season. Robert Rovner and Jessica Queller returned to serve as the season's showrunners without their former co-showrunner Andrew Kreisberg, who was fired during the previous season.

Writing
Following the conclusion of the third season, which closed with a second Kara Danvers born from the aura that escaped during the final battle with Reign being found by Russian soldiers in Siberia, Robert Rovner and Jessica Queller confirmed that the fourth season would be inspired by the Superman: Red Son comic book mini-series. Queller described the adaptation as "an homage" to the series, which portrays what would have happened if Superman had landed in Russia and became a hero there instead of in America. The story intended to examine the nature-versus-nurture debate, and developed as a "slow-burn" throughout the season.

At San Diego Comic-Con 2018, Rovner and Queller stated that the season would aim to be more "grounded" than previous seasons in order to touch on topical real-world issues. They confirmed that the fourth season would look to refocus on Kara's professional career as a reporter and see her act as a mentor to Cat Grant's former protégé, both at CatCo and as a superhero, paralleling Kara's own journey of coming into her own. The duo added that "This is the season where Kara becomes as much a hero as Supergirl." Teasing the main villain of the season, the producers described Agent Liberty as the leader of "a hate group that supports a human-first world order" and under the guise of a family man, provokes "anti-alien sentiment in the country, echoing the hateful rhetoric we're seeing right now in certain American politics."

Rovner and Queller also announced that the theme of the season would be "What is stronger: hope or fear?" Melissa Benoist commented that, "I think their main premise is that fear itself is a villain, and can hope conquer it? Supergirl stands for hope, so we'll see." Queller concurred, adding that the season would investigate, "How can [Supergirl] be a beacon of hope when she represents what people are afraid of?"

Casting
Main cast members Melissa Benoist, Mehcad Brooks, Chyler Leigh, David Harewood, and Katie McGrath return from previous seasons as Kara Danvers / Kara Zor-El / Supergirl, James Olsen / Guardian, Alex Danvers, J'onn J'onzz / Martian Manhunter, and Lena Luthor, respectively. Benoist also portrays Red Daughter, the clone of Kara. The fourth season is the first not to feature original cast member Jeremy Jordan, who plays Winn Schott. While it was initially announced that he would shift into a recurring capacity for the fourth season, Rovner later said he would not appear until the fifth season. Chris Wood and Odette Annable, who became regulars in the second and third seasons, respectively, too did not reprise their roles as Mon-El and Samantha Arias / Reign, respectively, as regulars in the fourth season. Jesse Rath was promoted to a series regular after previously recurring in the third season as Querl "Brainy" Dox / Brainiac 5. Sam Witwer joined the main cast as Agent Liberty. Nicole Maines and April Parker Jones had been cast as series regulars and would portray Nia Nal / Dreamer and Colonel Lauren Haley, respectively, with the former to become the first transgender superhero on television.

Brent Spiner was originally cast as Vice President Baker in August, but the role was recast later that month with Bruce Boxleitner due to Spiner having "family issues conflicting with the show's production dates". Lex Luthor, Lena's half-brother and the archnemesis of Kara's cousin Superman, was introduced in this season; Jon Cryer, who portrayed Lex's nephew Lenny Luthor in the film Superman IV: The Quest for Peace, was cast in the role.

Filming
Production for the season began on July 11, 2018, in Vancouver, British Columbia, and concluded in April 2019. Melissa Benoist joined filming following the conclusion of her run on Broadway as the star of Beautiful: The Carole King Musical on August 4, 2018.

Arrowverse tie-ins
In May 2018, Arrow star Stephen Amell announced at The CW upfronts that the next Arrowverse crossover would feature Batwoman and Gotham City. The crossover "Elseworlds" was a pilot for Batwoman solo series which was launched in October 2019.

Marketing
The main cast of the season as well as executive producers Robert Rovner, Jessica Queller, and Sarah Schechter attended San Diego Comic-Con on July 21, 2018 to promote the season.

Release

Broadcast
In May 2018, it was announced that Supergirl, which had aired on Mondays since its debut, would move to Sundays for its fourth season due to the  wrong date due  programming expansion to Sunday nights. The season premiered on The CW in the United States on October 14, 2018. The annual crossover episode will swap time-slots with The Flash for that week and will air on Tuesday, December 11.

Home media
The season was released on DVD and Blu-ray on September 17, 2019 with special features including the show's 2018 Comic-Con panel, deleted scenes and a gag reel. The Blu-ray release also included all three episodes of the fifth annual Arrowverse crossover event titled "Elseworlds".

Reception

Ratings

Critical response
The review aggregation website Rotten Tomatoes reports a 87% approval rating for the fourth season, with an average rating of 7.26/10 based on 7 reviews. The website's critic consensus reads: "Though it's a little tonally inconsistent, Supergirl'''s fourth season still soars thanks to strong, relevant writing brought to life by its charming cast."

Reviewing for Den of Geek, Delia Harrington gave the premiere a rating of 4/5, writing: "The Supergirl season 4 opener sows the seeds of a season's worth of conflict while being a great episode in its own right." IGNs Jesse Schedeen said of the premiere that, "After a disappointing finish to a generally underwhelming Season 3, it's good to see Supergirl quickly bouncing back this week. 'American Alien' sets the stage for a promising conflict to come, introducing memorable new villains and supporting characters and forcing Kara to confront the things she can't control in her city. Supergirl is borrowing several pages from the X-Men playbook, and that's by no means a bad thing." He gave the episode a rating of 8.6/10, concluding that, "Supergirl's fourth season is off to a promising start thanks to an eventful and dramatic premiere episode." Overall, he gave 9/10 points to the whole season, stating that "Supergirl's fourth season is undoubtedly the strongest to date, thanks in large part to the concerted effort to make up for the lack of compelling, nuanced villains in year's past. The finale episode ties all those threads together in a satisfying way, wrapping up the shared saga of Red Daughter, Agent Liberty and Lex Luthor while also setting up Lena Luthor to become Kara's greatest and most personal enemy yet."
Caroline Siede of The A.V. Club concurred with Schedeen's X-Men comparison, reflecting that over the seasons, "[Supergirl] has grown both more explicit and more nuanced in its handling of social and political issues." Siede gave the premiere a "B+" grade, explaining, "I'm tempering my optimism with just a little bit of caution. [...] Supergirl still has plenty of room to grow, but it's nice to see the show get its core ethos so right."

The book Adapting Superman: Essays on the Transmedia Man of Steel includes the chapter "Forging Kryptonite: Lex Luthor's Xenophobia as Societal Fracturing, from Batman v Superman to Supergirl," which analyzes Lex Luthor's actions in Season 4 "as a representation exploring the cultural effects of encroaching xenophobia" from society to the family in the years following the 2016 United States presidential election.

Accolades

|-
! scope="row" rowspan="5" | 2019
| rowspan="2" | Leo Awards
| Best Sound in a Dramatic Series
| data-sort-value="Petty, Kyle" | Kyle Petty ("Man of Steel")
| 
| 
|-
| Best Visual Effects in a Dramatic Series
| data-sort-value="Babityan, Gevork" | Gevork Babityan, Kris Cabrera, Armen V. Kevorkian, Mike Leeming, Brian Reiss ("Call to Action")
| 
| 
|-
| rowspan="3" | Teen Choice Awards
| Choice TV Show: Action
| Supergirl''
| 
| 
|-
| Choice TV Actress: Action
| Melissa Benoist
| 
| 
|-
| Choice TV Villain
| Jon Cryer
| 
| 
|}

Notes

References

2018 American television seasons
2019 American television seasons
Supergirl (TV series) seasons
United States presidential succession in fiction
Discrimination in fiction